In molecular biology, calmodulin binding domain (CaMBD) is a protein domain found in small-conductance calcium-activated potassium channels (SK channels). These channels are independent of voltage and gated solely by intracellular Ca2+. They are heteromeric complexes that comprise pore-forming alpha-subunits and the Ca2+-binding protein calmodulin (CaM). CaM binds to the SK channel through the CaMBD, which is located in an intracellular region of the alpha-subunit immediately carboxy-terminal to the pore. Channel opening is triggered when Ca2+ binds the EF hands in the N-lobe of CaM. The structure of this domain complexed with CaM is known. This domain forms an elongated dimer with a CaM molecule bound at each end; each CaM wraps around three alpha-helices, two from one CaMBD subunit and one from the other.

References

Protein families